Route 265 is a -long local highway in northwestern New Brunswick, Canada.

Communities along Route 265
 Kedgwick River
 Six-Milles
 Quatre-Milles
 Rang-Double-Nord

See also
List of New Brunswick provincial highways

References

New Brunswick provincial highways
Roads in Restigouche County, New Brunswick